The Northside is an area composed of northern Richmond, Virginia and some parts of Henrico County, Virginia.

The area is home to many diverse neighborhoods, especially early streetcar suburbs, including Barton Heights, Bellevue, Ginter Park, Washington Park, Hermitage Road, Highland Park, Sherwood Park, etc. These neighborhoods are made up of houses with a variety of architectural styles, which include Arts and Crafts Bungalows, Romanesque Revival, and Queen Anne houses among other styles.

Geographic boundaries
Northside encompasses those areas of the city that are both north and east of Interstate 95 and north and west of Interstate 64 (which for a brief span merge through the urban heart of the city), as well as Bryan Park.

The term "Northside" also broadly includes much of central Henrico County as a portion of the Richmond Metropolitan area, being an extension of the development within the (now-fixed) city limits. Communities outside the city limits in this area include the census-designated places of Chamberlayne, Dumbarton, East Highland Park, Glen Allen, Lakeside, and Laurel.

History and neighborhoods

  
  
 

Richmond's Northside is home to numerous neighborhoods listed as historic district including the Chestnut Hills-Plateau and Barton Heights neighborhoods.

Richmond's North Side includes the suburbs of Ginter Park, Bellevue, and Laburnum Park, along with many other areas. Lewis Ginter is generally associated with North Side creation but he died in 1897 and wasn't there for neighborhood construction.
The seminary remains the architectural core of the Union Presbyterian Seminary on Brook Road. The seminary, with its distinctive red-brick exterior, remains the architectural core of the city.
Neighborhood construction started during the first decade of the 20th century with big houses on Seminary Avenue's 3,500 block. Work on Bellevue started by 1894 when Ginter's close business associate John Pope, who bought the property now comprising the community, designed the Bellevue Arch as an imposing and inviting gateway.
Today this community stands strong as beacon of peace, prosperity and history. It is a wonderful community showing the true beauty of historic Richmond and what it has to offer.

Landmarks
Some notable commercial and civic attractions on the Northside are Virginia Center Commons shopping mall, remnants of the Azalea Mall, Joseph Bryan Park, Richmond Raceway (formerly the Strawberry Hill Fairgrounds), and Lewis Ginter Botanical Garden.

References

External links 
Northside - Richmond (VA) website
North Richmond News neighborhoods news blog

“Historic, eclectic Bellevue is a Richmond neighborhood with personality” - Richmond Times Dispatch

Neighborhoods in Richmond, Virginia